This is a list of science fiction anime television series, films, OVAs and ONAs.

References

Science fiction